Lisfannon Links Halt railway station served Lisfannon Golf Course in County Donegal, Ireland.

The station opened in 1892 on the Londonderry and Lough Swilly Railway line from Londonderry Graving Dock to Carndonagh.

It closed for passengers on 6 September 1948.

Routes

References

Disused railway stations in County Donegal
Railway stations opened in 1892
Railway stations closed in 1948
1892 establishments in Ireland
1948 disestablishments in Ireland
Railway stations in the Republic of Ireland opened in the 19th century